Kushk-e Khaleseh-ye Pain (also Romanized as Kūshk-e Khāleşeh-ye Pā’īn; also known as Kūshk-e Pā’īn) is a village in Lajran Rural District, in the Central District of Garmsar County, Semnan Province, Iran. At the 2006 census, its population was 29, in 7 families.

References 

Populated places in Garmsar County